Eric Bokanga Musau (born 9 October 1989) is a Congolese international footballer who plays as a striker for AS Vita Club.

Club career
Born in Kinshasa, Bokanga has played in the Congo DR for JAC Trésor and AS Vita Club, in Angola for Benfica de Luanda and in Rwanda for APR.

After playing 13 times for Belgian club Standard Liège during the 2010-11 season, Bokanga was released by them in January 2011, returning briefly to play for Benfica de Luanda, before returning to the Congo in March 2011 to play for TP Mazembe. He later played for Benfica de Luanda (twice), Progresso do Sambizanga and FC Renaissance.

In 2018, he played for Progresso Sambizanga and later in the season transferred to F.C. Bravos do Maquis. After spells at Progresso do Sambizanga and Interclube, Bokanga returned to AS Vita Club in Congo.

International career
Bokanga made his international debut for Congo DR in 2009.

References

1989 births
Living people
Footballers from Kinshasa
Democratic Republic of the Congo footballers
Democratic Republic of the Congo international footballers
S.L. Benfica (Luanda) players
AS Vita Club players
APR F.C. players
Standard Liège players
TP Mazembe players
Progresso Associação do Sambizanga players
FC Renaissance du Congo players
Belgian Pro League players
Girabola players
Association football forwards
Democratic Republic of the Congo expatriate footballers
Democratic Republic of the Congo expatriate sportspeople in Angola
Expatriate footballers in Angola
Democratic Republic of the Congo expatriate sportspeople in Rwanda
Expatriate footballers in Rwanda
Democratic Republic of the Congo expatriate sportspeople in Belgium
Expatriate footballers in Belgium
21st-century Democratic Republic of the Congo people